Ash Ridge or Ashridge may refer to:

 Ash Ridge, Ohio, an unincorporated community in Brown County
 Ash Ridge, Wisconsin, an unincorporated community in Richland County

 Ashridge, a country estate and stately home in Hertfordshire, England in the United Kingdom
 Ashridge Executive Education, a business school at the above estate